The Forth and Endrick Football Association (commonly known as the Forth and Endrick League) is a welfare football league, operating in the central belt of Scotland.

History 
Formed in 1910, the league is competed for during the summer months, and has operated continuously apart from the years 1915 to 1920 (the First World War) and 1940 to 1945 during the Second World War.
In addition to the league competition instituted in 1912 and 1913 and re-established in 1920, the member clubs take part in the Association's cup competitions. These are the Cameron Cup (first competed in 1910), the MacGregor Ferguson Cup (first competed in 1972),the Iain Telfer Cup (first competed in 1979) and the Margaret White Trophy (first competed in 1982). Since 1974 the Salmon Leap Inn Trophy has been awarded to the club which scores the highest number of goals in the league competition.
The Association additionally makes two awards annually to individual players - the Stirling Observer Trophy to the player voted Player of the Year and the William Gordon Memorial Cup to the player voted Man of the Match in the Cameron Cup Final.

Members clubs

Current clubs

Former clubs

References

External links
 Forth and Endrick on Facebook
 Forth and Endrick - Stirling Observer

Football leagues in Scotland
Scottish Welfare Football Association
Football in Stirling (council area)
1910 establishments in Scotland
Sports organizations established in 1910